Theodor Schaefer (23 January 1904, in Telč – 19 March 1969, in Brno) was a Czech composer and pedagogue.

Life

Theodor Schaefer was born in Telč on 23 January 1904. During 1922–1926, he studied composition with Jaroslav Kvapil and conducting with František Neumann at the Brno Conservatory. He continued his music education at the Prague Conservatory where he studied composition under Vítězslav Novák (1926–1929). During 1930–1934, he taught at the Municipal Music School in Kutná Hora. In 1934, Schaefer moved to Brno where he taught composition and music theory, first at the private music school of Václav Kaprál (1934–1940) and later at the Brno Conservatory (1940–1959). In 1959, Schaefer became a professor of composition at the Janáček Academy of Music in Brno. For several years he also conducted Brněnské orchestrální sdružení and Brno Radiojournal Ensemble. During 1960s he served as chair of the Union of Czechoslovak Composers (Brno branch) and was instrumental in founding the Brno International Music Festival. Theodor Schaefer died on 19 March 1969 in Brno.

Selected works 
Stage
 Švanda dudák (Švanda the Bagpiper), Children's Opera (1925); libretto by F. Tomek
 Honza dobrák, Children's Opera (1923); libretto by F. Tomek
 Mauglí (Mowgli), Incidental Music to the play by Rudyard Kipling for piano (1932)
 Legenda o štěstí (Legend of Happiness), Ballet, Op. 23 (1950–1953)

Orchestral
 Tři české tance ve starém slohu (3 Czech Dances in Olden Style) (1930)
 Scherzo Piccolo, Op. 9 (1937)
 Valašská serenáda (Wallachian Serenade), Symphonic Poem, Op. 12 (1939)
 Janošík, Ballad-Overture, Op. 15 (1939)
 Legenda o štěstí (Legend of Happiness), Suite from the ballet, Op. 23b (1950–1953, 1955)
 Pekelné tance (Infernal Dances) from the ballet Legenda o štěstí, Op. 23c (1950–1953, 1958)
 Tři části (3 Sections) from the ballet Legenda o štěstí, Op. 23d (1950–1953, 1955)
 Taneční suita (Dance Suite) from the ballet Legenda o štěstí, Op. 23f (1950–1953, 1958)
 Symphony, Op. 25 (1957–1961)
 Rapsódická reportáž (Rhapsodic Report), Op. 28 (1959–1960)

Concertante
 Concerto for piano and orchestra, Op. 10 (1937–1943)
 Sinfonia pastorale concertante alla maniera di stile classico for flute, oboe, bassoon and chamber orchestra, Op.23a (1954); from the ballet Legenda o štěstí
 Diathema for viola and orchestra, Op. 24 (1955–1956)
 Barbar a růže (The Barbarian and the Rose) for piano and orchestra, Op. 27 (1958–1959)
 Glosae instrumentale for 2 pianos and chamber ensemble, Op. 32 (1965); unfinished

Chamber music
 String Quartet No. 1 in D minor, Op. 2 (1929)
 Suita pro hoboj a klavír (Suite for oboe and piano) (1929–1930)
 Violin Concerto for violin and piano, Op. 4 (1933)
 Wind Quintet for flute, oboe, clarinet, horn and bassoon, Op. 5 (1934–1935)
 String Quartet No. 2, Op. 16 (1940–1941)
 Slavnostní fanfáry (Brněnská konzervatoř) (Festive Fanfares for Brno Conservatory) (1943)
 String Quartet No. 3, Op. 21 (1944–1945)
 Divertimento mesto, Octet for flute, oboe, clarinet, horn, bassoon, violin, viola and cello, Op. 22 (1946–1947)
 Slavnostní fanfáry pro Univerzitu Palackého v Olomouci (Festive Fanfares for Palacký University of Olomouc) (1948)
 Cigánovy housle (The Gyspy's Violin) for violin and piano, Op. 29 (1960–1961)
 Fanfáry pro Janáčkovu akademii múzických umění v Brně (Fanfares for the Janáček Academy of Music and Performing Arts in Brno) for 4 trumpets, 3 trombones and tuba, Op. 30 (1961)

Piano
 Sonatina, Op. 6 (1935–1936)
 Romantické skladby (Romantic Pieces); 6 Pieces, Op. 7 (1936)
 Klavírní etudy (Etudes for Piano), Suite in 5 movements, Op. 8 (1936–1937)
 Klavírní etudy (Etudes for Piano), 2 Dances, Op. 11 (1937–1938)
 Index, 16 Pieces in 2 books, Op. 13 (1938)
 Elegie za Zdeničku (Elegy for Zdenička), Suite in 5 movements, Op. 20 (1944)

Choral 
 Anemonky (The Anemones) for male chorus; words by Jaroslav Vrchlický
 Poštovní schránka (Mail Box) for mixed chorus, Op. 3 (1932); words by Jiří Wolker
 Tři mužské sbory (3 Male Choruses), Op. 14 (1939)
 Vlast Libušina (Libuše's Homeland), 3 female choruses a cappella, Op. 17 (1940); words by Alois Vojkůvka
 Zimní kantáta (Winter Cantata) for soprano, mixed chorus and orchestra, Op. 19 (1943–1945); words by Kamil Bednář
 Dva madrigaly (2 Madrigals) for female chorus a cappella, Op. 26 (1957)
 Světské requiem (Secular Requiem), Op. 33 (1964); unfinished

Vocal
 Jaro přichází (Spring Is Coming), 3 Songs for female voice and piano, Op. 1 (1925); words by M. Kaulfusová, Josef Václav Sládek and A. Nováková
 Podivný svět (Strange World), Cycle of 5 songs for tenor and piano (1925–1926); words by A. Kraus and M. Kaulfusová
 Ukolébavka (Lullaby) for voice and piano (1931); words by L. Beková
 Julie aneb Snář (Julie, or The Dream), Melodrama in 3 acts for soloists, chamber orchestra, jazz instruments and piano (1933–1934); words by Georges Neveux in Czech translation by Jindřich Hořejší
 Milostné balady (Love Ballads), 5 Songs for female voice and piano, Op. 18 (1943)
 Bithematicon, 4 Songs for baritone and piano, Op. 31 (1967)
 Rašení for voice and piano; words by František Serafínský Procházka
 Hvězdám for voice and piano; words by Jaroslav Vrchlický
 Sežloutla ta lípa for voice and piano; words by Jaroslav Vrchlický
 Balada horská for voice and piano; words by Jan Neruda
 Balada dětská for voice and piano; words by Jan Neruda
 Čerevený květ for voice and piano; words by Petr Bezruč
 Má matka hrála for voice and piano; words by Karel Hlaváček

Students 
 Pavel Blatný
 Ctirad Kohoutek
 Ivan Petrželka
 Alois Piňos
 Zdeněk Pololaník
 Zdeněk Zouhar

References 

1904 births
1969 deaths
People from Telč
People from the Margraviate of Moravia
Czech classical composers
Czech male classical composers
Czech musicologists
20th-century classical composers
20th-century musicologists
20th-century Czech male musicians
Brno Conservatory alumni